Penny Princess is a 1952 British Technicolor comedy film written and directed by Val Guest and starring Yolande Donlan, Dirk Bogarde and A. E. Matthews. It was made by Guest for his own production company, Conquest Productions. The film stars his future wife Donlan, who was Guest's production company partner, and features Reginald Beckwith, the other partner in Conquest Productions. It was released by General Film Distributors. It was distributed in America the following year by Universal Pictures.

It was made at Pinewood Studios near London. Location shooting took place in Montseny, Catalonia, the first British production to be filmed in Spain. The film's sets were designed by the art director Maurice Carter.

Plot
The fictional European microstate of Lampidorra has "no taxes, no quotas, no tariffs, no forms to fill in". Its two thousand residents make their money from the national (and legal) profession of smuggling to and from its neighbors: France, Italy, and Switzerland. However, the country falls on hard times and becomes bankrupt.

The small state seeks the financial support of the United States in the guise of a rich American who buys the whole country for $100,000.  When he dies shortly afterward, Lampidorra is inherited by his distant relative, Lindy Smith (Yolande Donlan), a Macy's shopgirl.

On the way to her new realm, Lindy meets Tony Craig (Dirk Bogarde), an inexperienced British salesman trying to sell cheese to the Swiss. When she arrives in Lampidorra, Lindy is met by the ruling triumvirate: the Chancellor (Erwin Styles), who is a cobbler, the Burgomeister (Kynaston Reeves), who is a policeman, and the Minister of Finance (Reginald Beckwith), who is a blacksmith. As her first royal decree, she outlaws smuggling. However, this exacerbates the financial crisis, as her inheritance will be tied up for at least six months by legalities.

By chance, teetotaler Lindy gets a bit tipsy when she samples Lampidorran "schneese", a cheese made with Schnapps. She decides it would make a terrific export and has Tony brought to her to help market it. The alcoholic cheese is a sensation, but the other European nations soon respond to the threat to their own cheese industries by imposing tariffs. Lampidorra turns to its traditional smuggling expertise to avoid paying them.

Tony falls in love with Lindy and proposes, but an intercepted telegram from his employer leads Lindy to wrongly suspect he is just after the secret recipe for schneese. The misunderstanding is eventually cleared up. In the end, Lindy finally receives her full inheritance, allowing her to bail out her subjects and depart with Tony.

Cast
Yolande Donlan as Lindy Smith
Dirk Bogarde as Tony Craig
A. E. Matthews as Selby, Tony's employer
Reginald Beckwith as Minister of Finance / Blacksmith
Mary Clare as Maria
Edwin Styles as Chancellor / Cobbler
Kynaston Reeves as Burgomaster / Policeman
Desmond Walter-Ellis as Alberto, Captain of the guard
Peter Butterworth as Julien / Postman / Farmer
 Alexander Gauge as MacNabb the Lawyer
 Laurence Naismith as Louis the Jailkeeper
 Eric Pohlmann as Monsieur Paul 
 Tom Macaulay as 	Grieves 
 MacDonald Parke as Schuyster the Lawyer 
 Fletcher Lightfoot as Grand Duke Johnson the First 
Raf De La Torre as Italian Attaché
 Anthony Oliver as 	Selby's Valet 
 Arthur Hill as Representative of Johnson K. Johnson 
 Robert Henderson as Macy's Staff Manager 
 Richard Wattis as 	Hotel Desk Clerk

Production
Val Guest attempted to obtain Montgomery Clift, Cary Grant, Robert Cummings and William Holden for the male cheese salesman lead, but they all turned him down. Eager for comedy after his performance in Hunted, Dirk Bogarde accepted his first light comedy role, though he thought the film "as funny as a baby's coffin".

Notes

External links

1952 films
1952 comedy films
British comedy films
1950s English-language films
Films about princesses
Films set in a fictional country
Films set in Europe
Films shot at Pinewood Studios
Films shot in Spain
Films scored by Ronald Hanmer
1950s British films